Pavlo Leonidovych Shkapenko (born 16 December 1972) is a former Ukrainian professional footballer.

Club career
He made his professional debut in the Soviet First League in 1990 for FC Metalurh Zaporizhya.

Honours
 Ukrainian Premier League champion: 1993, 1994, 1995, 1996, 1997.
 Ukrainian Cup winner: 1993, 1996.
 17 games, 2 goals in European club competitions, including 1 game for FC Torpedo Moscow in the UEFA Cup 2000–01.

External links
 Pavlo Leonidovych Shkapenko – International Appearances

References

1972 births
Footballers from Zaporizhzhia
Living people
Soviet footballers
Association football midfielders
Association football forwards
Ukrainian footballers
Ukrainian expatriate footballers
Ukraine international footballers
FC Metalurh Zaporizhzhia players
FC Dynamo Kyiv players
FC Dynamo-2 Kyiv players
FC Dynamo-3 Kyiv players
FC Arsenal Kyiv players
FC CSKA Kyiv players
FC CSKA-2 Kyiv players
FC Elista players
FC Torpedo Moscow players
FC Shinnik Yaroslavl players
FC Tom Tomsk players
FC Kuban Krasnodar players
Expatriate footballers in Russia
Ukrainian expatriate sportspeople in Russia
Soviet Top League players
Soviet First League players
Ukrainian Premier League players
Ukrainian First League players
Ukrainian Second League players
Russian Premier League players
Russian First League players
Russian Second League players